A controversy was caused in New Zealand in 2014 when the National Party used sound-alike music to the song "Lose Yourself" by American rapper Eminem in a campaign advertisement during that year's election. The Wellington High Court ruled against the National Party, ordering them to pay over $600,000 for copyright infringement. This was partially overturned by the Court of Appeal of New Zealand, which reduced the damages to $225,000.

Background
On 16 September 2016, Eminem's publishers filed a lawsuit with the High Court in Wellington, claiming that the National Party, its advertising agency and  others  involved in  creating and licensing the  track had made a copyright infringement from using an instrumental version of the song "Lose Yourself" in television advertisements without their consent. Their campaign manager Steven Joyce stated their using of the song was "pretty legal", claiming it had been purchased from an Australian music library. The publishers counter-claimed that they never allowed the song to be used in a political advert. The trial began at the Wellington High Court on 1 May 2017. The case concluded on 12 May 2017; Justice Helen Cull reserved her decision. On 25 October, the High Court ruled that the National Party and its co defendants ( Stan3 Ltd, Sale St Studios Ltd, Amcos NZ Ltd, Australasian Mechanical  Copywright Owners Society Ltd,  Beatbox Music  Pty Ltd, Labrador Entertainment Inc  and the sound alike music's creator Michael Alan Cohen) had breached copyright and ordered them to pay $600,000 plus interest.

Aftermath
Eight Mile Style spokesman Joel Martin said the company was happy with the result following a "distasteful" trial for them, while National Party president Peter Goodfellow said the party was disappointed with the final verdict and would proceed themselves to pursue legal action against Labrador and Beatbox, who supplied them the music. Eminem told Variety that he was not consulted about the case, but should he receive any money from it he would donate it to charity for the Hurricane Harvey relief efforts.
Musician and former APRA director Mike Chunn said that sound-alike recordings are routinely used in advertising and that the ruling was unfair.

The National Party appealed the ruling on grounds that copyright wasn't breached and  if it was, the damages should have been lower. There was a cross-appeal from US companies Eight Mile Style and Martin Affiliated sought to have the damages to be increased. The Court of Appeal of New Zealand upheld the National Party's appeal on damages only and reduced the amount of the damages to $225,000.

Subsequently, Eight Mile Style sought leave to appeal the appeal decision in the Supreme Court in May 2019. The application for leave to appeal was dismissed and Eight Mile Style was ordered to pay $4500 in costs.

References

Copyright case law
Eminem
High Court of New Zealand cases
2014 New Zealand general election
New Zealand National Party
Political scandals in New Zealand
2017 in New Zealand law